The academic structure of the Australian National University is organised as seven academic colleges which contain a network of inter-related faculties, research schools and centres. Each college is responsible for undergraduate and postgraduate education as well as research in its respective field.

ANU College of Arts and Social Sciences
The ANU College of Arts and Social Sciences is divided into the Research School of Social Sciences (RSSS) and the Research School of Humanities and the Arts (RSHA). 

Within the Research School of Social Sciences there are schools dedicated to history, philosophy, sociology, political science and international relations, Middle Eastern studies and Latin American studies. 

RSHA contains schools focusing on anthropology, archaeology, classics, art history, English literature, drama, film studies, gender studies, linguistics, European languages as well as an art and music school.

ANU College of Asia and the Pacific
The ANU College of Asia and the Pacific is a specialist centre of Asian and Pacific studies and languages. The College is home to three academic schools: the Crawford School of Public Policy, a research intensive public policy school; the School of Culture History and Language, the nation's centre dedicated to investigating and learning with and about the people, languages, and lands of Asia and the Pacific; and Coral Bell School of Asia Pacific Affairs, Australia's foremost collection of expertise in the politics and international affairs of Asia and the Pacific. 

The college also houses the Australian Centre on China in the World (CIW), the Regulatory Institutions Network (RegNet) and the CSCAP Australia.

The College is affiliated with Columbia University's Weatherhead East Asian  Institute and Indiana University's Pan Asia Institute.

ANU College of Business and Economics
The ANU College of Business and Economics comprises four Research Schools, Research School of Accounting; Research School of Economics; Research School of Finance, Actuarial Studies & Statistics and Research School of Management

ANU College of Engineering and Computer Science
The ANU College of Engineering and Computer Science is divided into two Research Schools; the Research School of Computer Science and the Research School of Engineering. ANU is home to the National Computational Infrastructure National Facility and was a co-founder of NICTA, which was the main information and communications technology research centre in Australia until 2016. At that stage NICTA was merged with CSIRO to form Data 61, a Research Business Unit.

ANU College of Law

The ANU College of Law, established in 1960, conducts legal research and teaching, with centres dedicated to commercial law, international law, public law and environmental law. It is the 7th oldest of Australia's 36 law schools.

ANU College of Medicine, Biology and Environment

The ANU College of Medicine, Biology and Environment encompasses the John Curtin School of Medical Research (JCSMR), the ANU Medical School, the Fenner School of Environment & Society and Research Schools of Biology, Psychology and Population Health.

ANU College of Physical & Mathematical Sciences
The ANU College of Physical & Mathematical Sciences comprises the Research Schools of Astronomy & Astrophysics, Chemistry, Earth Sciences, Mathematical Sciences and Physics.

Research School of Physics
The ANU Research School of Physics focuses primarily on research into materials science and engineering; lasers, nonlinear optics and photonics; nanotechnology and mesoscopic physics; physics of atoms, molecules and the nucleus; plasma physics and surface science; physics and the environment. Under the direction of Mark Oliphant, nuclear physics was one of the university's most notable early research priorities, leading to the construction of a 500 megajoule homopolar generator and a 7.7 megaelectronvolts cyclotron in the 1950s.

University centres

There are individual research centres connected to the University.

Asia Pacific College of Diplomacy
Crawford School of Economics and Government 
Australian Primary Health Care Research Institute
Centre for Aboriginal Economic Policy Research 
Centre for Applied Philosophy and Public Ethics
Centre for Cross-Cultural Research, 1997–2008?, an ARC Centre of Excellence
Centre for Mental Health Research 
Centre for the Public Awareness of Science 
Centre for Sustainable Energy Systems
Eccles Institute of Neuroscience
Humanities Research Centre 
National Centre for Epidemiology and Population Health
The National Centre for Information Systems Research
National Graduate School of Management 
Mathematical Sciences Institute 
The National Europe Centre

Australian National Institute for Public Policy 
In May 2010, Prime Minister Kevin Rudd announced a $111.7 million commitment to the development by ANU of a new Australian National Institute for Public Policy. The new National Institute is intended to centralize public policy expertise. A good portion of the funds ($53.1 million) were earmarked for building and developing the previously announced Australian Centre on China in the World, which is one of three specialist centres along with the National Security College and the Australia and New Zealand School of Government to be specifically incorporated under the umbrella of the National Institute. $19.8 million is set aside to create a joint building for the other two centres, with a further $17.3 million expressly dedicated to the National Security College.

References

Australian National University